Ḥamawī is an Arabic toponymic surname or nisba of Hama, Syria. Notable people with the surname include:

 Mohamad Al Hamawi (born 1984), Syrian footballer
 Yaqut al-Hamawi (1179–1229), Muslim scholar of Byzantine ancestry in the late Abbasid period

Arabic-language surnames
Nisbas